Drayton railway station co-served the city of Chichester, West Sussex, England, from 1846 to 1963 on the Brighton and Chichester Railway.

History 
The station was opened on 8 June 1846 by the London, Brighton and South Coast Railway. It closed to passengers on 1 June 1930 and closed to goods on 9 September 1963.

References 

Disused railway stations in West Sussex
Railway stations in Great Britain opened in 1846
Railway stations in Great Britain closed in 1930
1846 establishments in England
1963 disestablishments in England
Former London, Brighton and South Coast Railway stations